Nightwatching is a 2007 film about the artist Rembrandt and the creation of his 1642 painting The Night Watch. The film is directed by Peter Greenaway and stars Martin Freeman as Rembrandt, with Eva Birthistle as his wife Saskia van Uylenburg, Jodhi May as his lover Geertje Dircx, and Emily Holmes as his other lover Hendrickje Stoffels. Reinier van Brummelen is the director of photography. James Willcock, known for his esoteric sets,  is the art director.

The film is described by co-producer Jean Labadie as "a return to the Greenaway of The Draughtsman's Contract." It features Greenaway's trademark neoclassical compositions and graphic sexuality. The music is by Włodek Pawlik. The film premiered in competition, at the Venice Film Festival.

Nightwatching is the first feature in Greenaway's film series "Dutch Masters". The following film in the series is Goltzius and the Pelican Company.

An associated work by the same director is the documentary film Rembrandt's J'Accuse (2008), in which Greenaway addresses 34 "mysteries" associated with the painting, illustrated by scenes from the drama.

Plot 
The film is centred on the creation of The Night Watch, Rembrandt's most famous work, depicting civilian militiamen who wanted to be celebrated in a group portrait. The film posits a conspiracy to murder within the musketeer regiment of Frans Banninck Cocq and Willem van Ruytenburch, and suggests that Rembrandt may have immortalized a conspiracy theory using subtle allegory in his group portrait of the regiment, subverting what was to have been a highly prestigious commission for both painter and subject.

The film also depicts Rembrandt's personal life, and suggests he suffered serious consequences in later life as a result of the accusation contained in his most famous painting.

Cast
 Martin Freeman as Rembrandt
 Eva Birthistle as Saskia van Uylenburg
 Jodhi May as Geertje Dircx
 Emily Holmes as Hendrickje Stoffels
 Toby Jones as Gerard Dou
 Michael Teigen as Carel Fabritius
 Agata Buzek as Titia Uylenburgh
 Natalie Press as Marieke
 Fiona O'Shaughnessy as Marita
 Adrian Lukis as Frans Banninck Cocq
 Michael Culkin as Herman Wormskerck
 Christopher Britton as Rombout Kemp

Gallery

References

External links
 
 
 
 

2007 films
Films directed by Peter Greenaway
Films about Rembrandt
Films set in the 1640s
Films set in Amsterdam
Films set in the Dutch Golden Age
2000s English-language films
2000s British films